Carl Henry Lindner III is an American businessman from Cincinnati, Ohio. He has served as the co-chief executive officer of American Financial Group since January 2005. He has also acted as chief executive officer and majority owner of FC Cincinnati since the club's founding in 2015. He is the son of Carl Lindner Jr. and a prominent member of the Lindner family.

Biography
Carl Lindner III was born to Carl Lindner Jr. and Edyth Bailey in 1953 in Cincinnati, Ohio. He received a Bachelor of Business Administration degree from the University of Cincinnati in 1975.

In 1975, Lindner began working at American Financial Group, which his father had bought two years prior. He has served as chairman of Great American Insurance Company since 1987. He became a director and co-president of American Financial in 1996 and additionally was elected as the co-chief executive officer along with his brother S. Craig Lindner in January 2005.

In 1989, Carl and Martha Lindner were involved as founders and major benefactors in Cincinnati Hills Christian Academy, a private university-preparatory school in Cincinnati.

In 2015, Lindner was involved in co-founding soccer club FC Cincinnati, and is the chief executive officer and majority owner. Speaking about the success and high attendance the club received in its inaugural season, general manager Jeff Berding said, "What has happened is directly attributable to having Carl and the Lindner family as our majority owners. It's the foundation of everything."

In 2016, the University of Cincinnati bestowed an honorary doctorate to Lindner.

In his State of the City speech in October 2016, Cincinnati mayor John Cranley named Jeff Berding and Carl Lindner III as the shared holders of the Cincinnatian of the Year award for their work managing FC Cincinnati.

Personal life
Lindner has been identified as a "devout Christian," and begins each day with thirty minutes of prayer. He and his wife Martha have four children and three grandchildren and reside in Cincinnati.

References

Living people
1954 births
Lindner family
Businesspeople from Ohio
20th-century American businesspeople
21st-century American businesspeople
American businesspeople in insurance
FC Cincinnati
FC Cincinnati owners
Major League Soccer owners
American chief executives of professional sports organizations
USL Championship executives